The New York Times crossword puzzle is a daily American-style crossword puzzle published in The New York Times, online on the newspaper's website, syndicated to more than 300 other newspapers and journals, and on mobile apps.

The puzzle is created by various freelance constructors and has been edited by Will Shortz since 1993. The crosswords are designed to increase in difficulty throughout the week, with the easiest puzzle on Monday and the most difficult on Saturday. The larger Sunday crossword, which appears in The New York Times Magazine, is an icon in American culture; it is typically intended to be as difficult as a Thursday puzzle. The standard daily crossword is 15 by 15 squares, while the Sunday crossword measures 21 by 21 squares.

History
Although crosswords became popular in the early 1920s, The New York Times (which initially regarded crosswords as frivolous, calling them "a primitive form of mental exercise") did not begin to run a crossword until 1942, in its Sunday edition. The first puzzle ran on Sunday, February 15, 1942.  The motivating impulse for the Times to finally run the puzzle (which took over 20 years even though its publisher, Arthur Hays Sulzberger, was a longtime crossword fan) appears to have been the bombing of Pearl Harbor; in a memo dated December 18, 1941, an editor conceded that the puzzle deserved space in the paper, considering what was happening elsewhere in the world and that readers might need something to occupy themselves during blackouts. The puzzle proved popular, and Sulzberger himself authored a Times puzzle before the year was out.

In 1950, the crossword became a daily feature. That first daily puzzle was published without an author line, and as of 2001 the identity of the author of the first weekday Times crossword remained unknown.

There have been four editors of the puzzle: Margaret Farrar from the puzzle's inception until 1969; Will Weng, former head of the Times metropolitan copy desk, until 1977; Eugene T. Maleska until his death in 1993; and the current editor, Will Shortz. In addition to editing the Times crosswords, Shortz founded and runs the annual American Crossword Puzzle Tournament as well as the World Puzzle Championship (where he remains captain of the US team), has published numerous books of crosswords, sudoku, and other puzzles, authors occasional variety puzzles (also known as "Second Sunday puzzles") to appear alongside the Sunday Times puzzle, and serves as "Puzzlemaster" on the NPR show "Weekend Edition Sunday".

The puzzle's popularity grew over the years, until it came to be considered the most prestigious of the widely circulated U.S. crosswords. Many celebrities and public figures have publicly proclaimed their liking for the puzzle, including opera singer Beverly Sills, author Norman Mailer, baseball pitcher Mike Mussina, former President Bill Clinton, conductor Leonard Bernstein, TV host Jon Stewart, and music duo the Indigo Girls.

The Times puzzles have been collected in hundreds of books by various publishers, most notably Random House and St. Martin's Press, the current publisher of the series. In addition to appearing in the printed newspaper, the puzzles also appear online on the paper's website, where they require a separate subscription to access. In 2007, Majesco Entertainment released The New York Times Crosswords game, a video game adaptation for the Nintendo DS handheld. The game includes over 1,000 Times crosswords from all days of the week. Various other forms of merchandise featuring the puzzle have been created, including dedicated electronic crossword handhelds that just contain Times crosswords, and a variety of Times crossword-themed memorabilia, including cookie jars, baseballs, cufflinks, plates, coasters, and mousepads.

Style and conventions
Will Shortz does not write the Times crossword himself; a wide variety of contributors submit puzzles to him. A full specification sheet listing the paper's requirements for crossword puzzle submission can be found online or by writing to the paper. 

The Monday–Thursday puzzles and the Sunday puzzle always have a theme, some sort of connection between at least three long (usually Across) answers, such as a similar type of pun, letter substitution, or alteration in each entry. Another theme type is that of a quotation broken up into symmetrical portions and spread throughout the grid. For example, the February 11, 2004, puzzle by Ethan Friedman featured a theme quotation: ANY IDIOT CAN FACE / A CRISIS IT'S THIS / DAY-TO-DAY LIVING / THAT WEARS YOU OUT. (This quotation has been attributed to Anton Chekhov, but that attribution is disputed and the specific source has not been identified.) Notable dates such as holidays or anniversaries of famous events are often commemorated with an appropriately themed puzzle, although only two are routinely commemorated annually: Christmas and April Fool's Day. 

The Friday and Saturday puzzles, the most difficult, are usually themeless and "wide open", with fewer black squares and more long words. The maximum word count for a themed weekday puzzle is normally 78 words, while the maximum for a themeless Friday or Saturday puzzle is 72; Sunday puzzles must contain 140 words or fewer. Given the Times's reputation as a paper for a literate, well-read, and somewhat arty audience, puzzles frequently reference works of literature, art, or classical music, as well as modern TV, movies, or other touchstones of popular culture.

The puzzle follows a number of conventions, both for tradition's sake and to aid solvers in completing the crossword:
 Nearly all the Times crossword grids have rotational symmetry: they can be rotated 180 degrees and remain identical. Rarely, puzzles with only vertical or horizontal symmetry can be found; yet rarer are asymmetrical puzzles, usually when an unusual theme requires breaking the symmetry rule. Starting in January 2020, diagonal symmetry began appearing in Friday and Saturday puzzles. This rule has been part of the puzzle since the beginning; when asked why, initial editor Margaret Farrar is said to have responded, "Because it is prettier."
 Any time a clue contains the tag "abbr." or an abbreviation more significant than "e.g.", the answer will be an abbreviation (e.g., M.D. org. = AMA).
 Any time a clue ends in a question mark, the answer is a play on words. (e.g., Fitness center? = CORE)
 Occasionally, themed puzzles will require certain squares to be filled in with a symbol, multiple letters, or a word, rather than one letter (so-called "rebus" puzzles). This symbol/letters/word will be repeated in each themed entry. For example, the December 6, 2012, puzzle by Jeff Chen featured a rebus theme based on the chemical pH scale used for acids and bases, which required the letters "pH" to be written together in a single square in several entries (in the middle of entries such as "triumpH" or "sopHocles").
 French-, Spanish-, or Latin-language answers, and more rarely answers from other languages are indicated either by a tag in the clue giving the answer language (e.g., 'Summer: Fr.' = ETE) or by the use in the clue of a word from that language, often a personal or place name (e.g. 'Friends of Pierre' = AMIS or 'The ocean, e.g., in Orleans' = EAU).
 Clues and answers must always match in part of speech, tense, number, and degree. Thus a plural clue always indicates a plural answer (and the same for singular), a clue in the past tense will always be matched by an answer in the same tense, and a clue containing a comparative or superlative will always be matched by an answer in the same degree.
 The answer word (or any of the answer words, if it consists of multiple words) will not appear in the clue itself. Unlike in some easier puzzles in other outlets, the number of words in the answer is not given in the clue—so a one-word clue can have a multiple-word answer.
 The theme, if any, will be applied consistently throughout the puzzle; e.g., if one of the theme entries is a particular variety of pun, all the theme entries will be of that type.
 In general, any words that might appear elsewhere in the newspaper, such as well-known brand names, pop culture figures, or current phrases of the moment, are fair game.
 No entries involving profanity, sad or disturbing topics, or overly explicit answers should be expected, though some have sneaked in. The April 3, 2006, puzzle contained the word SCUMBAG (a slang term for a condom), which had previously appeared in a Times article quoting people using the word. Shortz apologized and said the term would not appear again. PENIS also appeared once in a Shortz-edited puzzle in 1995, clued as "The __ mightier than the sword."
 Spoken phrases are always indicated by enclosure in quotation marks, e.g., "Get out of here!" = LEAVE NOW.
 Short exclamations are sometimes clued by a phrase in square brackets, e.g., "[It's cold!]" = BRR.
 When the answer can only be substituted for the clue when preceding a specific other word, this other word is indicated in parentheses. For example, "Think (over)" = MULL, since "mull" only means "think" when preceding the word "over" (i.e., “think over” and "mull over" are synonymous, but "think" and "mull" are not necessarily synonymous otherwise). The point here is that the single word "think" can be replaced by the single word "mull", but only when the following word is "over".
 When the answer needs an additional word in order to fit the clue, this other word is indicated with the use of "with". For example, "Become understood, with in" = SINK, since "Sink in" (but not "Sink" alone) means "to become understood." The point here is that the single phrase "become understood" can be replaced with the single phrase "sink in", regardless of whether it is followed by anything else.
 Times style is to always capitalize the first letter of a clue, regardless of whether the clue is a complete sentence or whether the first word is a proper noun. On occasion, this is used to deliberately create difficulties for the solver; e.g., in the clue "John, for one", it is ambiguous whether the clue is referring to the proper name John or to the slang term for a bathroom.

Variety puzzles

Second Sunday puzzles
In addition to the primary crossword, the Times publishes a second Sunday puzzle each week, of varying types, something that the first crossword editor, Margaret Farrar, saw as a part of the paper's Sunday puzzle offering from the start; she wrote in a memo when the Times was considering whether or not to start running crosswords that "The smaller puzzle, which would occupy the lower part of the page, could provide variety each Sunday. It could be topical, humorous, have rhymed definitions or story definitions or quiz definitions. The combination of these two would offer meat and dessert, and catch the fancy of all types of puzzlers." Currently, every other week is an acrostic puzzle authored by Emily Cox and Henry Rathvon, with a rotating selection of other puzzles, including diagramless crosswords, Puns and Anagrams, cryptics (a.k.a. "British-style crosswords"), Split Decisions, Spiral Crosswords, word games, and more rarely, other types (some authored by Shortz himself—the only puzzles he has created for the Times during his tenure as crossword editor). Of these types, the acrostic has the longest and most interesting history, beginning on May 9, 1943, authored by Elizabeth S. Kingsley, who is credited with inventing the puzzle type, and continued to write the Times acrostic until December 28, 1952. From then until August 13, 1967, it was written by Kingsley's former assistant, Doris Nash Wortman; then it was taken over by Thomas H. Middleton for a period of over 30 years, until August 15, 1999, when the pair of Cox and Rathvon became just the fourth author of the puzzle in its history. The name of the puzzle also changed over the years, from "Double-Crostic" to "Kingsley Double-Crostic," "Acrostic Puzzle," and finally (since 1991) just "Acrostic."

Other puzzles
As well as a second word puzzle on Sundays, the Times publishes a KenKen numbers puzzle (a variant of the popular sudoku logic puzzles) each day of the week. The KenKen and second Sunday puzzles are available online at the New York Times crosswords and games page, as are "SET!" logic puzzles, a word search variant called "Spelling Bee" in which the solver uses a hexagonal diagram of letters to spell words of four or more letters in length, and a monthly bonus crossword with a theme relating to the month. The Times Online also publishes a daily "mini" crossword by Joel Fagliano, which is 5×5 Sunday through Friday and 7×7 on Saturdays and is significantly easier than the traditional daily puzzle. Other "mini" and larger 11×11 "midi" puzzles are sometimes offered as bonuses.

Records and puzzles of note
Fans of the Times crossword have kept track of a number of records and interesting puzzles (primarily from among those published in Shortz's tenure), including those below. (All puzzles published from November 21, 1993, on are available to online subscribers to the Times crossword.)
 Fewest words in a daily 15x15 puzzle: 50 words, on Saturday, June 29, 2013, by Joe Krozel; in a Sunday puzzle: 120 words on August 21, 2022, by Brooke Husic and Will Nediger.
 Most words in a daily puzzle: 86 words on Tuesday, December 23, 2008, by Joe Krozel; in a 21x21 Sunday puzzle: 150 words, on June 26, 1994, by Nancy Nicholson Joline and on November 21, 1993, by Peter Gordon (the first Sunday puzzle edited by Will Shortz)
 Fewest black squares (in a daily 15x15 puzzle): 17 blocks, on Friday, July 27, 2012, by Joe Krozel
 Most prolific author: Manny Nosowsky is the crossword constructor who has been published most frequently in the Times under Shortz, with 241 puzzles (254 including pre-Shortz-era puzzles, published before 1993), although others may have written more puzzles than that under prior editors. The record for most Sunday puzzles is held by Jack Luzzato, with 119 (including two written under pseudonyms); former editor Eugene T. Maleska wrote 110 himself, including 8 under other names.
 Youngest constructor: Daniel Larsen, aged 13 years and 4 months.
 Oldest constructor: Bernice Gordon was 100 on August 11, 2014, when her final Times crossword was published. (She died in 2015 at the age of 101.) Gordon published over 150 crosswords in the Times since her first puzzle was published by Margaret Farrar in 1952.
 Greatest difference in ages between two constructors of a single puzzle: 83, a puzzle by David Steinberg (age 16) and Bernice Gordon (age 99) with the theme AGE DIFFERENCE.
 15-letter-word stacks: On December 29, 2012, Joe Krozel stacked five 15-letter entries, something never before or since achieved. Krozel, Martin Ashwood-Smith, George Barany and Erik Agard have stacked four 15-letter entries in a puzzle. Since 2010, Krozel, Ashwood-Smith, Kevin G. Der, and Jason Flinn have stacked two sets of four 15-letter entries in a puzzle.
 Lowest word count for a debut puzzle: 62 words, on Saturday, June 1, 2019, by Ari Richter.

A few crosswords have achieved recognition beyond the community of crossword solvers. Perhaps the most famous is the November 5, 1996, puzzle by Jeremiah Farrell, published on the day of the U.S. presidential election, which has been featured in the movie Wordplay and the book The Crossword Obsession by Coral Amende, as well as discussed by Peter Jennings on ABC News, featured on CNN, and elsewhere. The two leading candidates that year were Bill Clinton and Bob Dole; in Farrell's puzzle one of the long clue/answer combinations read "Title for 39-Across next year" = MISTER PRESIDENT. The remarkable feature of the puzzle is that 39-Across could be answered either CLINTON or BOB DOLE, and all the Down clues and answers that crossed it would work either way (e.g., "Black Halloween animal" could be either BAT or CAT depending on which answer you filled in at 39-Across; similarly "French 101 word" could equal LUI or OUI, etc.). Constructors have dubbed this type of puzzle a Schrödinger or quantum puzzle after the famous paradox of Schrödinger's cat, which was both alive and dead at the same time. Since Farrell's invention of it, 16 other constructors—Patrick Merrell, Ethan Friedman, David J. Kahn, Damon J. Gulczynski, Dan Schoenholz, Andrew Reynolds, Kacey Walker and David Quarfoot (in collaboration), Ben Tausig, Timothy Polin, Xan Vongsathorn, Andrew Kingsley and John Lieb (in collaboration), Zachary Spitz, David Steinberg and Stephen McCarthy have used a similar trick.

In another notable Times crossword, 27-year-old Bill Gottlieb proposed to his girlfriend, Emily Mindel, via the crossword puzzle of January 7, 1998, written by noted crossword constructor Bob Klahn. The answer to 14-Across, "Microsoft chief, to some" was BILLG, also Gottlieb's name and last initial. 20-Across, "1729 Jonathan Swift pamphlet", was A MODEST PROPOSAL. And 56-Across, "1992 Paula Abdul hit", was WILL YOU MARRY ME. Gottlieb's girlfriend said yes. The puzzle attracted attention in the AP, an article in the Times itself, and elsewhere. Other Times crosswords with a notable wedding element include the June 25, 2010, puzzle by Byron Walden and Robin Schulman, which has rebuses spelling I DO throughout, and the January 8, 2020, puzzle by Joon Pahk and Amanda Yesnowitz, which was used at the latter’s wedding reception.

On May 7, 2007, former U.S. president Bill Clinton, a self-professed long-time fan of the Times crossword, collaborated with noted crossword constructor Cathy Millhauser on an online-only crossword in which Millhauser constructed the grid and Clinton wrote the clues. Shortz described the President's work as "laugh out loud" and noted that he as editor changed very little of Clinton's clues, which featured more wordplay than found in a standard puzzle. Clinton made his print constructing debut on Friday, May 12, 2017, collaborating with Vic Fleming on one of the co-constructed puzzles celebrating the crossword's 75th Anniversary.

The Times crossword of Thursday, April 2, 2009, by Brendan Emmett Quigley, featured theme answers that all ran the gamut of movie ratings—beginning with the kid-friendly "G" and finishing with adults-only "X" (now replaced by the less crossword-friendly "NC-17"). The seven theme entries were GARY GYGAX, GRAND PRIX, GORE-TEX, GAG REFLEX, GUMMO MARX, GASOLINE TAX, and GENERATION X. In addition, the puzzle contained the clues/answers of 'Weird Al' Yankovic's '__ on Jeopardy = I LOST and "I'll take New York Times crossword for $200, __" = ALEX. What made the puzzle notable is that the prior night's episode of the US television show Jeopardy! featured video clues of Will Shortz for five of the theme answers (all but GARY GYGAX and GENERATION X) which the contestants attempted to answer during the course of the show.

Controversies 
The Times crossword has been criticized for a lack of diversity in its constructors and clues. Major crosswords like those in the Times have historically been largely written, edited, fact-checked, and test-solved by older white men. Less than 30% of puzzle constructors in the Shortz Era have been women. In the 2010s, only 27% of clued figures were female, and 20% were of minority racial groups. 

In January 2019, the Times crossword was criticized for including the racial slur "BEANER" (clued as "Pitch to the head, informally", but also a derogatory slur for Mexicans). Shortz apologized for the distraction this may have caused solvers, claiming that he had never heard the slur before.

See also
 Wordplay, a 2006 documentary about the crossword

References

External links
  
 
 

Crosswords
Crossword
1942 introductions